Southwestern Youth Association is a junior sports league that houses hundreds of house level teams and dozens of travel clubs. It was founded in 1973. It operates for the areas of Centreville and Clifton, Virginia, United States.

Sports 
Baseball
Basketball
Cheerling
Field Hockey
Football
Lacrosse
Rugby
Soccer
Softball
Swimming and Diving
Track and Field Sports
Volleyball
Wrestling

External links 
Southwestern Youth Association

Sports in Virginia